Dolynske is a village (a selo) in the Zaporizhzhia Raion (district) of Zaporizhzhia Oblast in southern Ukraine. Its population was 690 in the 2001 Ukrainian Census. Dolynske is the administrative center of the Dolynske Rural Council, a local government area.

The village was first founded in 1809 as Kronstal or Kronsthal by German-speaking Mennonites settling the Chortitza Colony. In 1892, its name was changed to Pavlivka. Since 1963, the village is known as Dolynske.

References

Populated places established in 1809
German communities in Ukraine
Former German settlements in Zaporizhzhia Oblast
1809 establishments in Ukraine

Zaporizhzhia Raion
Villages in Zaporizhzhia Raion